Noël Treanor (born 25 December 1950) is an Irish prelate of the Catholic Church who was appointed Apostolic Nuncio to the European Union with the personal title of archbishop on 26 November 2022. He was Bishop of Down and Connor in Ireland from 2008 to 2022.

Early life and education 
Noël Treanor was born on 25 December 1950 at Silverstream, Co Monaghan, in the Parish of Tyholland in the Diocese of Clogher. He attended St Brigid’s National School, Leitrim, and completed his early education at St Mary’s C.B.S., Monaghan. He began, in 1968, his study of Arts and Philosophy at St. Patrick's College, Maynooth, and later, in 1971, the study of Theology, achieving his Licentiate in Sacred Theology, with special commendation, in 1977.

Priestly Ministry in Europe 
After being ordained a priest on 13 June 1976 in the Cathedral of St Macartan, in the Diocese of Clogher, Treanor was sent by Bishop Patrick Mulligan, to the Pontifical Irish College in Rome to study theology at the Pontifical Gregorian University. Recalled in 1980 by the new Bishop of the Diocese, Joseph Duffy, he was appointed assistant in the Cathedral parish, with charge of the local Catholic Marriage Advisory Council.

From 1981 to 1985, he again studied theology in Rome, while at the same time serving as Prefect of Studies at the Irish College. Having returned to his diocese in 1985, he was appointed Director of Adult Education. He also organised the Diocesan Assembly of the clergy that was held in 1986 to promote pastoral renewal within the Diocese.

Treanor's next appointment was a curacy in Enniskillen, Co Fermanagh, where he also provided service at the general hospital and was active as a confessor at Lough Derg pilgrimage centre.

In 1989, he was sent to Brussels to work with COMECE. While deeply involved in the expanding endeavour of this Church body to project Christian values into the European process, he continued to engage in pastoral work through contact with the English-speaking community in the city centre. He has also published and lectured widely on European construction issues, the Church and Europe, and Church-State matters.

On 31 March 1993, Treanor was appointed to succeed Paul Schaeffer of France as Secretary General of COMECE for a three-year term. He was reappointed for several terms. On 18 May 1994, he was nominated Chaplain to His Holiness.

He is fluent in English, French, German, Italian, Spanish and Irish.

Bishop 

On 22 February 2008, Pope Benedict XVI appointed Treanor Bishop of Down and Connor, to succeed Patrick Walsh, who had been bishop since 1991.

Treanor was consecrated bishop on 29 June 2008 in St. Peter's Cathedral, Belfast, by Cardinal Brady with Patrick Walsh and Joseph Duffy as co-consecrators. Treanor took possession of his diocese at the same ceremony. Treanor's episcopal consecration was the first of a newly appointed bishop as Bishop of Down and Connor since the consecration of Daniel Mageean in 1929.

A few weeks before the Irish voted on the Lisbon Treaty in October 2009, Treanor said that Roman Catholics could vote for it in good conscience. He cited his long experience in Brussels in assuring a parliamentary committee that the EU had provided binding guarantees to protect Irish control of issues like abortion and "traditional Irish state neutrality".

In November 2009, Treanor described the findings of the Murphy Report as horrific and said that he was confident that his diocese had rid itself of all abusing priests.

In August 2010, Treanor expressed his support for an international, independent inquiry into the 11 killings carried out by the parachute regiment in the Ballymurphy area of west Belfast in 1971. Treanor was speaking at a press conference where previously undisclosed documents from church archives relating to the events were being made available for the first time.
Treanor said: "As with Bloody Sunday, the reputations of those who were killed were actively besmirched and the evidence of the available eyewitnesses was either ignored or actively discredited. Indeed the events in Ballymurphy on August 9th-11th, 1971, would and perhaps should have been considered the necessary starting point for such an inquiry."

Apostolic Nuncio
On 26 November 2022, Pope Francis appointed Treanor Apostolic Nuncio to the European Union and gave him the personal title of archbishop.

See also
 List of heads of the diplomatic missions of the Holy See

References

External links

 Catholic-hierarchy.org

1950 births
Living people
21st-century Roman Catholic bishops in Ireland
Bishops appointed by Pope Benedict XVI
Alumni of St Patrick's College, Maynooth
Roman Catholic bishops of Down and Connor
Pontifical Gregorian University alumni
Pontifical Irish College alumni
Apostolic Nuncios to the European Union
Diplomats of the Holy See